Hofmann Island (Остров Гофмана; Ostrov Gofmana) is an island in Franz Josef Land, Russian Arctic.

It is located  further east from Rainer Island and it has three small islets on its northeastern shores.

Hofmann island is the site of a snow runway.

This island is said to have been named after Freiherr Leopold von Hoffmann, a member of the Austro-Hungarian North Pole Society, though a differing claim attributes the namesake to be Russian geologist Ernst Reinhold von Hofmann.

Northeast of Hofmann Island runs a  channel known as Proliv Severo Vostochnyy, beyond which lies Belaya Zemlya.

References

External links
Location

Islands of Franz Josef Land